The 1993–94 Southampton F.C. season was the club's second in the Premier League, and their 24th season in the top division of English football. Having narrowly avoided relegation from the newly formed league the previous season, the club were looking to improve their performances in order to remain in the top flight for another year. For the second year in a row, Southampton finished 18th in the league, again just one point above the relegation zone. They also reached the third round of the FA Cup, and the second round of the League Cup.

The club brought in a number of players throughout the season to try and bolster the squad – defenders Simon Charlton and Paul McDonald were transferred during the 1993 summer transfer window, followed by midfielders Paul Allen and Peter Reid, and goalkeeper Dave Beasant, later in the year. After Christmas Southampton also enlisted the services of striker Craig Maskell, midfielder Jim Magilton, and winger Neil Heaney. Tim Flowers was sold to Blackburn Rovers in November 1993 for £2 million, while Glenn Cockerill, Paul Moody and Micky Adams all departed too.

Halfway through the season, on 10 January 1994, Southampton manager Ian Branfoot was dismissed from his position at the club. At the time, the club were placed second from bottom in the Premier League table, with just five wins from a total of 24 matches. Former Saints midfielder Alan Ball was appointed as Branfoot's replacement, and made an instant impact by leading the team to three wins out of the next four matches, and eventually to safety in the Premier League. He would remain with Southampton for the following season, and left in 1995.

At the end of the season Southampton finished 18th in the Premier League table with 12 wins, 7 draws and 23 losses, just two positions and one point above the relegation zone. Matthew Le Tissier was the club's top scorer with 25 goals in the league, making him the third best goalscorer in the league that season. Le Tissier also won the Southampton Player of the Season award, joining Peter Shilton and Tim Flowers as a second winner of the accolade. At the end of the season, striker Lee Powell was released from the club.

FA Premier League

Southampton's start to the second Premier League season was one of the worst in the league, with the club losing eight out of their first nine games. In the other match the Saints picked up their best win of the season, overcoming Swindon Town 5–1, with Matthew Le Tissier scoring two goals. The team improved throughout October and November, picking up 11 points from a total of 21 in a seven-match period, including tight home wins over Newcastle United and Tottenham Hotspur, and a 2–0 win at Aston Villa. During this period, Le Tissier continued to increase his scoring record by netting six more times for Southampton.

Following this positive run of results, Southampton had dropped back into the relegation zone by Christmas when they lost five games in a row, scoring just one goal overall. In the three matches immediately after Christmas, the club beat Chelsea 3–1, drew 1–1 with Manchester City, and lost 0–1 to Norwich City, after which chairman Guy Askham dismissed manager Ian Branfoot and replaced him with former Saints midfielder Alan Ball.

With Ball in charge fortunes appeared to change, as Southampton won four of their next five games, the only loss coming against Oldham Athletic. During this period, Matthew Le Tissier scored at least once in every match, including a hat-trick against Liverpool. Thanks to those wins, by the end of February the Saints were up to 17th in the table, their highest position that season. The run didn't last long however, as the side went seven matches without a win between 5 March and 9 April 1994, including a 0–4 loss against Arsenal at The Dell.

Southampton saved their Premier League place in the final month of the season, winning three and drawing one to pull themselves up to 18th in the table, the same position as the season before. The first win was a dramatic 5–4 victory over Norwich City, in which Le Tissier scored his second hat-trick of the season. The second win came against Blackburn Rovers, to whom the Saints had in recent times sold both star striker Alan Shearer and mainstay goalkeeper Tim Flowers, and the third win was the second of the season over Aston Villa, which Southampton won 4–1. The final match of the season saw the Hampshire side sharing the spoils with West Ham United in a dramatic 3–3 draw at the Boleyn Ground, which meant they dropped down from 17th to 18th in the final Premier League standings.

FA Cup
As a Premier League club, Southampton entered the 1993–94 FA Cup in the Third Round. They were drawn against Second Division side Port Vale, who defeated the Saints 1–0 in the replay following a 1–1 draw in which Iain Dowie scored.

League Cup
As a Premier League club, Southampton entered the 1993–94 Football League Cup in the Second Round. They were drawn against Third Division side Shrewsbury Town, who defeated the Saints 2–0 in the second leg after Southampton's 1–0 first leg victory.

Squad statistics

Most appearances

Top goalscorers

Transfers

References

Southampton F.C. seasons
Southampton